Troglohyphantes lucifuga is a species of cave spider of the family Linyphiidae.  Its distribution is European:  France, Italy, Switzerland.

Morphology 
Troglohyphantes lucifuga  is a small sized spider, with a body length of ca. 7mm.

References 

Linyphiidae
Spiders of Europe
Spiders described in 1884